A total lunar eclipse took place on Saturday, May 14, 1938. This was the last total lunar eclipse of Saros cycle 120. It was visible from Oceania, the Pacific Ocean, North America, South America and Antarctica.

Visibility

Related lunar eclipses

Half-Saros cycle
A lunar eclipse will be preceded and followed by solar eclipses by 9 years and 5.5 days (a half saros). This lunar eclipse is related to two total solar eclipses of Solar Saros 127.

See also
List of lunar eclipses
List of 20th-century lunar eclipses

Notes

References

 Total Eclipse of the Moon: 1938 May 14 HM Nautical Almanac Office
 The Lunar Eclipse of 1938 may 14 and its Saros Series, with Plate VI Pogo, Alexander, Popular Astronomy, Vol. 46, p.385

External links
 May 13/14, 1938 — Total Lunar Eclipse www.timeanddate.com

1938-05
1938 in science